Staphylococcus lentus is a Gram-positive, oxidase-positive, coagulase-negative member of the bacterial genus Staphylococcus consisting of clustered cocci.  The species was originally classified as a subspecies; its name is a combination derived from Staphylococcus sciuri subsp. lentus.

Of all studied S. sciuri subspecies, only S. lentus has been found to use the trisaccharide raffinose.

References

Further reading

External links
Type strain of Staphylococcus lentus at BacDive -  the Bacterial Diversity Metadatabase

lentus